is a Japanese professional mixed martial artist and the former DEEP Bantamweight Champion. He is also an occasional kickboxer.

Mixed martial arts career

Japanese career
Daiki began his professional MMA career in July 2004 for the Pancrase promotion. Over the next four years, he amassed a record of 8 wins, 5 losses and 1 draw primarily in that promotion. During this time he had a victory over WEC contenders Kenji Osawa.

In August 2008, Daiki began fighting for the DEEP promotion. Over the next few years he would also fight for DREAM, K-1, Cage Force, and S-Cup.

In April 2013, Daiki defeated Yoshiro Maeda to become the DEEP Bantamweight Champion. He vacated the title

Road to UFC: Japan
In June 2015, Hata was announced as one of the eight featherweights competing on Road to UFC: Japan, a show in the style of The Ultimate Fighter. He defeated Tatsunao Nagakura in the quarterfinals. In the semifinals, he lost to Mizuto Hirota by decision.

Rizin Fighting Federation
In his debut for the Rizin Fighting Federation, Hata faced Hiroyuki Takaya on December 29, 2015. He lost the fight via unanimous decision.

Return to DEEP
After the one-fight stint in Rizin FF, Hata returned to DEEP to face Yuki Motoya at DEEP Cage Impact 2016 on October 18, 2016. He lost the fight via unanimous decision.

Hata then went on to lose against Takahiro Ashida before defeating Kyosuke Yokoyama and Koichi Ishizuka consecutively, earning him a title shot. Hata challenged Satoshi Yamasu for the DEEP Featherweight Championship at DEEP 89 on May 12, 2019. He lost the bout via second-round technical knockout.

Hata then faced Kouya Kanda at DEEP 100 on February 21, 2021. He lost the fight via unanimous decision.

Hata faced Tetsuya Seki at DEEP 103 on September 23, 2021. He won the bout via unanimous decision.

Hata faced Kosuke Terashima at DEEP 107 on MAy 8, 2022 for the Interim DEEP Bantamweight Championship. He lost the bout via unanimous decision.

Championships and accomplishments
DEEP
DEEP Bantamweight Champion (one time; former)

Mixed martial arts record

|-
| 
| align=center| 
| Jinnosuke Kashimura
|
| DEEP Tokyo Impact 2023 2nd Round
| 
| align=center| 
| align=center|
| Tokyo, Japan
| 
|-
| Loss
| align=center| 21–15–7
| Kosuke Terashima
| Decision (unanimous)
| DEEP: 107 Impact
| 
| align=center| 3 
| align=center| 5:00 
| Tokyo, Japan
| 
|-
| Win
| align=center| 21–14–7
| Tetsuya Seki
| Decision (unanimous)
| DEEP: 103 Impact
| 
| align=center| 3
| align=center| 5:00
| Tokyo, Japan
| 
|-
| Loss
| align=center| 20–14–7
| Kouya Kanda
| Decision (unanimous)
| DEEP 100 Impact - 20th Anniversary
| 
| align=center| 3
| align=center| 5:00
| Tokyo, Japan
| 
|-
| Win
| align=center| 20–13–7
| Yuki Ohara
| Submission (arm-triangle choke)
| DEEP: 93 Impact
| 
| align=center| 1
| align=center| 1:35
| Tokyo, Japan
| 
|-
| Loss
| align=center| 19–13–7
| Satoshi Yamasu
| TKO (punches)
| DEEP: 89 Impact
| 
| align=center| 2
| align=center| 0:11
| Tokyo, Japan
| 
|-
| Win
| align=center| 19–12–7
| Koichi Ishizuka
| Decision (unanimous)
| DEEP: 87 Impact
| 
| align=center| 3
| align=center| 5:00
| Tokyo, Japan
| 
|-
| Win
| align=center| 18–12–7
| Kyosuke Yokoyama
| Decision (unanimous)
| DEEP: 85 Impact
| 
| align=center| 3
| align=center| 5:00
| Tokyo, Japan
| 
|-
| Loss
| align=center| 17–12–7
| Takahiro Ashida
| Decision (unanimous)
| DEEP: 79 Impact
| 
| align=center| 3
| align=center| 5:00
| Tokyo, Japan
| 
|-
| Loss
| align=center| 17–11–7
| Yuki Motoya
| Decision (unanimous)
| DEEP Cage Impact 2016
| 
| align=center| 3
| align=center| 5:00
| Tokyo, Japan
| 
|-
| Loss
| align=center| 17–10–7
| Hiroyuki Takaya
| Decision (unanimous)
| Rizin Fighting Federation 1: Day 1
| 
| align=center| 3
| align=center| 5:00
| Saitama, Japan
| 
|-
| Win
| align=center| 17–9–7
| Seiji Akao 
| Decision (split)
| DEEP: 69th Impact
| 
| align=center| 3
| align=center| 5:00
| Tokyo, Japan
| 
|-
| Win
| align=center| 16–9–7
| Yoshiro Maeda
| TKO (punches)
| DEEP: 62nd Impact
| 
| align=center| 2
| align=center| 1:41
| Tokyo, Japan
| 
|-
| Win
| align=center| 15–9–7
| Toshiaki Kitada
| Decision (unanimous) 
| DEEP: 61st Impact
| 
| align=center| 3
| align=center| 5:00
| Tokyo, Japan
| 
|-
| Win
| align=center| 14–9–7
| Yoshiki Harada
| TKO (punches)
| DEEP: Cage Impact 2012 
| 
| align=center| 2
| align=center| 4:33
| Tokyo, Japan
|
|-
| Draw
| align=center| 13–9–7
| Toshiaki Kitada
| Draw (majority)
| DEEP: 60th Impact
| 
| align=center| 3
| align=center| 5:00
| Tokyo, Japan
|
|-
| Win
| align=center| 13–9–6
| Seiji Akao
| KO (punches)
| DEEP: 59th Impact
| 
| align=center| 1
| align=center| 3:20
| Tokyo, Japan
|
|-
| Draw
| align=center| 12–9–6
| Makoto Kamaya
| Draw (majority)
| DEEP: 58th Impact
| 
| align=center| 2
| align=center| 5:00
| Tokyo, Japan
|
|-
| Draw
| align=center| 12–9–5
| Tomomi Iwama
| Draw
| DEEP: Cage Impact 2012 in Tokyo: Over Again
| 
| align=center| 2
| align=center| 5:00
| Tokyo, Japan
|
|-
| Win
| align=center| 12–9–4
| Yusaku Nakamura
| TKO (punches) 
| DEEP: 57th Impact
| 
| align=center| 1
| align=center| 3:57
| Tokyo, Japan
|
|-
| Loss
| align=center| 11–9–4
| Tatsumitsu Wada
| Decision (unanimous) 
| DEEP: 55th Impact
| 
| align=center| 2
| align=center| 5:00
| Tokyo, Japan
|
|-
| Loss
| align=center| 11–8–4
| Masakazu Imanari
| Decision (unanimous) 
| Deep: 50 Impact
| 
| align=center| 3
| align=center| 5:00
| Tokyo, Japan
| 
|-
| Loss
| align=center| 11–7–4
| Mitsuhiro Ishida
| Decision (unanimous) 
| DREAM.15
| 
| align=center| 2
| align=center| 5:00
| Saitama, Saitama, Japan
|
|-
| Loss
| align=center| 11–6–4
| Kazuyuki Miyata
| Decision (unanimous) 
| DREAM.11
| 
| align=center| 2
| align=center| 5:00
| Yokohama, Japan
| 
|-
| Win
| align=center| 11–5–4
| Hideo Tokoro
| Decision (unanimous) 
| DREAM.8
| 
| align=center| 2
| align=center| 5:00
| Nagoya, Japan
| 
|-
| Win
| align=center| 10–5–4
| Shoji Maruyama
| Decision (unanimous) 
| Deep: Fan Thanksgiving Festival
| 
| align=center| 3
| align=center| 5:00
| Tokyo, Japan
|
|-
| Win
| align=center| 9–5–4
| Naoya Uematsu
| TKO (punches)
| Deep: 39 Impact
| 
| align=center| 1
| align=center| 2:30
| Tokyo, Japan
| 
|-
| Draw
| align=center| 8–5–4
| Jong Man Kim 
| Draw
| Deep: 37 Impact
| 
| align=center| 3
| align=center| 5:00
| Tokyo, Japan
|
|-
| Win
| align=center| 8–5–3
| David Love
| Submission (triangle choke) 
| Freestyle Combat Challenge 35
| 
| align=center| 3
| align=center| 4:48
| Racine, Wisconsin, United States
|
|-
| Loss
| align=center| 7–5–3
| Marlon Sandro
| Decision (unanimous)
| Pancrase: Rising 9
| 
| align=center| 3
| align=center| 5:00
| Tokyo, Japan
|
|-
| Loss
| align=center| 7–4–3
| Eben Oroz 
| Decision (majority)
| bodogFight - Vancouver
| 
| align=center| 3
| align=center| 5:00
| Vancouver, British Columbia, Canada
|
|-
| Win
| align=center| 7–3–3
| Jameel Massouh
| TKO (punches)
| Pancrase - Rising 5
| 
| align=center| 2
| align=center| 4:50
| Tokyo, Japan
|
|-
| Win
| align=center| 6–3–3
| Kentaro Imaizumi
| Decision (majority)
| Pancrase: Rising 3
| 
| align=center| 2
| align=center| 5:00
| Tokyo, Japan
|
|-
| Loss
| align=center| 5–3–3
| Yoshiro Maeda
| Decision (split)
| Pancrase: Blow 6
| 
| align=center| 3
| align=center| 5:00
| Kanagawa Prefecture, Japan
| 
|-
| Win
| align=center| 5–2–3
| Miki Shida
| TKO (punches) 
| Pancrase: Blow 5
| 
| align=center| 2
| align=center| 2:03
| Tokyo, Japan
|
|-
| Win
| align=center| 4–2–3
| Yoshiro Maeda
| TKO (punches)
| Pancrase: Blow 2
| 
| align=center| 2
| align=center| 0:35
| Osaka, Japan
|
|-
| Win
| align=center| 3–2–3
| Kenji Osawa
| Decision (split)
| GCM - D.O.G 4 
| 
| align=center| 2
| align=center| 5:00
| Tokyo, Japan
|
|-
| Win
| align=center| 2–2–3
| Takeshi Sato 
| TKO (punches)
| GCM - Demolition 051027
| 
| align=center| 1
| align=center| 3:49
| Tokyo, Japan
|
|-
| Loss
| align=center| 1–2–3
| Takumi Murata
| Decision (unanimous)  
| Pancrase: Spiral 6
| 
| align=center| 2
| align=center| 5:00
| Tokyo, Japan
|
|-
| Win
| align=center| 1–1-3
| Kentaro Imaizumi 
| Decision (unanimous)
| Pancrase: Spiral 5
| 
| align=center| 2
| align=center| 5:00
| Yokohama, Japan
|
|-
| Draw
| align=center| 0–1–3
| Katsuhiro Hirata
| Draw
| Pancrase: 2005 Neo-Blood Tournament Semifinals
| 
| align=center| 2
| align=center| 5:00
| Tokyo, Japan 
|
|-
| Loss
| align=center| 0–1–2
| Naoji Fujimoto 
| Decision (unanimous)
| Pancrase: 2005 Neo-Blood Tournament Eliminations
| 
| align=center| 2
| align=center| 5:00
| Tokyo, Japan 
|
|-
| Draw
| align=center| 0–0–2
| Takumi Murata 
| Draw
| GCM - Demolition 041015 
| 
| align=center| 2
| align=center| 5:00
| Tokyo, Japan
|
|-
| Draw
| align=center| 0–0–1
| Ryusuke Uemura
| Draw
| Pancrase: 2004 Neo-Blood Tournament Final
| 
| align=center| 2
| align=center| 5:00
| Tokyo, Japan
|

Kickboxing record

Legend:

References

External links

Living people
1982 births
Japanese male mixed martial artists
Featherweight mixed martial artists
Mixed martial artists utilizing kickboxing
Mixed martial artists utilizing shootboxing
Mixed martial artists utilizing wrestling
Japanese male kickboxers
Lightweight kickboxers
Japanese DJs
Sportspeople from Saitama (city)
Sasuke (TV series) contestants
Deep (mixed martial arts) champions